The 1984 Iowa Hawkeyes football team represented the University of Iowa in the 1984 Big Ten Conference football season. The Hawkeyes, led by head coach Hayden Fry, were members of the Big Ten Conference and played their home games at Kinnick Stadium.

Schedule

Roster

Rankings

Game summaries

Iowa State

Source: Box Score and Game Recap, Box Score and Game Recap

Penn State

Source: Box score and Game story, Box Score and Game Recap

at Ohio State

Source: Box score and Game story, Box Score
    
    
    
    
    
    
    
    
    
    
    
    

The Hawkeyes outgained the Buckeyes 458-335, but four turnovers (one returned for a touchdown) were too much to overcome on this trip to Columbus. Keith Byars ran, caught, and threw touchdowns for Ohio State.

Illinois

Source: Box score and Game story
    
    
    
    
    
    

The Hawkeyes exacted some revenge for the whipping laid on them in Champaign the previous season. The win over the defending Big Ten champions snapped the Illini's 12-game conference winning streak. Ronnie Harmon had 3 touchdown runs for Iowa.

at Northwestern

Sources: Box Score and Game story
    
    
    
    
    
    

The Hawkeyes held Northwestern to only 49 yards of total offense, a mark that still stands as a single-game school record. Ronnie Harmon recorded 3 touchdown runs for the second straight game.

at Purdue

Sources: Box Score and Game story
    
    
    
    
    
    
    
    

Chuck Long went 17-21 for 369 yards and 4 TD as Iowa won in West Lafayette for the first time since 1956, snapping a 12-game losing skid at Ross–Ade Stadium.

Michigan

Sources: Box Score and Game story
    
    
    
    
    

The Hawkeyes' 26-0 shutout of the Wolverines would end up being Bo Schembechler's worst loss in 21 years as head coach at Michigan.

at Indiana

Source: Box Score and Game Story
    
    
    
    
    
    
    

Chuck Long set an NCAA record by completing 22 consecutive passes (record stood until 1998) and tossed two touchdowns, and Ronnie Harmon ran for 160 yards and a touchdown in the victory over Indiana. Iowa sat atop the Big Ten standings after beating the Hoosiers, but would not win another conference game in 1984.

Wisconsin

Source: Box Score and Game Story

Michigan State

Source: Box Score and Game Story

at Minnesota

Source: Box Score and Game Story

at Hawaii

Source: Box Score and Game Story

vs. Texas (Freedom Bowl)

Source: Box Score 
    
    
    
    
    
    
    
    
    
    
    
    

Chuck Long 29-39, 461 yards, 6 TD

Postseason Awards
Larry Station, Linebacker – Consensus First-team All-American
Paul Hufford, Defensive Tackle - Big Ten Defensive Lineman of the Year

Team players in the 1985 NFL Draft

References

Iowa
Iowa Hawkeyes football seasons
Freedom Bowl champion seasons
Iowa Hawkeyes football